The Hawker Henley was a British two-seat target tug derived from the Hawker Hurricane that was operated by the Royal Air Force during the Second World War.

Design and development

In 1934 Air Ministry Specification P.4/34 was issued which called for a light bomber that could also be deployed in a close-support role as a dive-bomber. Fairey, Gloster and Hawker each offered designed to fill this role. As the aircraft only required a modest bomb load and with performance paramount, Hawker developed an aircraft similar to their Hurricane fighter.

The Hurricane was then in an advanced stage of development and there would be economies of scale if some assemblies were common to both aircraft. This resulted in the Henley sharing outer wing panels and tailplanes with the Hurricane. Both were equipped with the Rolls-Royce Merlin engine which offered the best power-weight ratio and minimized frontal area. The Henley's cantilever fabric-covered monoplane wing was mid-set, a retractable tail wheel landing gear was selected and accommodation provided for a pilot and observer/air gunner.

Although construction of the Henley prototype began in mid-1935, the Hurricane had priority, and it was not until 10 March 1937, powered by a Merlin "F" engine, that it first flew at Brooklands, shortly after the competing Fairey P.4/34.

By this time the Air Ministry had dropped its requirement for a light bomber, possibly because this role was adequately filled by the Fairey Battle. The Henley, was never fitted with dive brakes, bomb crutches, or dive bombing sights, which limited attack angles to under 70° and impacted accuracy, and was instead relegated to target-towing duties.

The Air Ministry's decision to abandon work on dive bombers in 1938 had much to do with the danger of engine overspeed in a dive. This could be alleviated by the use of a constant speed propeller, but these were not available in sufficient numbers until 1940 when they were urgently needed for Hurricanes.

Henley production was subcontracted to Gloster and 200 were ordered into production.

The second prototype was fitted with a propeller-driven winch to haul in a target tug's drogue cable after air-to-air firing sorties and first flew on 26 May 1938.

Operational history

Production Henley TT.III target tug aircraft entered service with Nos. 1, 5 and 10 Bombing and Gunnery Schools, as well as with the Air Gunnery Schools at Barrow, Millom and Squires Gate. Henleys were transferred to anti-aircraft co-operation units, however the drogues used for these were even larger and engine failures further increased, while there were also difficulties in releasing the drogues. Several Henleys were lost when the drogue could not be released quickly enough. No solution was found and in mid-1942, the Henley was withdrawn, in favour of modified Boulton Paul Defiants, and purpose-built Miles Martinet aircraft.

Variants
Henley I
Prototype.
Henley II
Second prototype.
Henley III
Two-seat target tug aircraft for the RAF, 200 built.
Hawker Hotspur
Prototype two seater fighter variant of the Henley with a four-gun power-driven turret. This did not reach production, the requirement being met by the Defiant.

Operators

 Royal Air Force
 No. 264 Squadron RAF
 No. 266 Squadron RAF
 No. 291 Squadron RAF
 No. 587 Squadron RAF
 No. 595 Squadron RAF
 No. 631 Squadron RAF
 No. 639 Squadron RAF
 No. 679 Squadron RAF
 No. 695 Squadron RAF

Specifications (Henley Mk III)

See also

References
Notes

Bibliography

 Cooper, H.J.,O.G. Thetford and C.B. Maycock. Aircraft of the Fighting Powers – Volume II. Leicester, UK: Harborough Publishing, 1942.
 Gunston, Bill. Classic World War II Aircraft Cutaways. London: Osprey, 1995. .
 Hannah, Donald. Hawker FlyPast Reference Library. Stamford, Lincolnshire, UK: Key Publishing Ltd., 1982. .
 James, Derek N. Hawker, an Aircraft Album No. 5. New York: Arco Publishing Company, 1973. . (First published in the UK by Ian Allan in 1972)
 Mason, Francis K. Hawker Aircraft since 1920. London: Putnam, 1991. .
 Mondey, David. The Hamyln Concise guide to British aircraft of World War II. London: Hamlyn/Aerospace, 1982. .

External links

 Hawker Henley
 Fleet Air Arm Hawker Henley
 contemporary comparison of Henley with other bombers
 Dingers Aviation Pages – Photos, description and history of the Hawker Henley 

1930s British military aircraft
Henley
Low-wing aircraft
Single-engined tractor aircraft
Aircraft first flown in 1937